The women's featherweight (52 kg/114.4 lbs) K-1 category at the W.A.K.O. World Championships 2007 in Belgrade was the lightest of the female K-1 tournaments.  There were seven women from two continents (Europe and Africa) taking part in the competition.  Each of the matches was three rounds of two minutes each and were fought under K-1 rules.    

As there was one too few competitors for an eight-person tournament, one woman had a bye through to the semi finals.  The gold medal match was won by Rajaa Hajdaowi from Morocco who defeated Russia's Yulia El Skaya in the final.  Defeated semi finalists Hungarian Eva Ott and Serbian Natasa Ninic made do with bronze medals.

Results

See also
List of WAKO Amateur World Championships
List of WAKO Amateur European Championships
List of female kickboxers

References

External links
 WAKO World Association of Kickboxing Organizations Official Site

Kickboxing events at the WAKO World Championships 2007 Belgrade
2007 in kickboxing
Kickboxing in Serbia